Arborea is a town and comune in the province of Oristano, Sardinia, Italy, whose economy is largely based on agriculture and cattle breeding with production of vegetables, rice, fruit and milk (notably the local milk product Arborea).

History 

Arborea was built by the fascist government of Italy in the 1920s, after the draining of the marshes which covered the area. The village was populated by families, mostly composed of peasants, who came from the regions of Veneto and Friuli in north-eastern Italy.

Name 
Arborea is named for and lies within the medieval Giudicato of Arborea, which had its capital, at various periods, in nearby Tharros and Oristano. The town was originally named Villaggio Mussolini (with which it was inaugurated on October 29, 1928), by the fascist government in honor of the Italian fascist dictator Benito Mussolini. Less than two years later, the name was revised to Mussolinia di Sardegna ("Mussolinia of Sardinia", to distinguish the town from Mussolinia di Sicilia, now Santo Pietro in the commune of Caltagirone, Province of Catania). The current name was adopted after World War II.

Twin towns 
 Mortegliano, Italy
 Sermoneta, Italy
 Zevio, Italy
 Villorba, Italy

References

External links 

History of Arborea and Mussolinia 

Planned cities
Italian fascist architecture
Populated places established in 1928
Planned cities in Italy
1930 establishments in Italy
States and territories established in 1930